The 1980 UEFA European Football Championship finals tournament was held in Italy. This was the sixth UEFA European Championship, which is held every four years and endorsed by UEFA. It was the first European Championship to feature eight teams in the finals, which took place between 11 and 22 June 1980. West Germany won the final 2–1 against Belgium for their second title. This was the last European Championship with a third place play-off.

Bid process
This was the first European Championship in which eight teams, rather than four, contested the finals tournament. On 17 October 1977 UEFA announced that England, Greece, Italy, Netherlands, Switzerland and West Germany had expressed interest in hosting this event. On 19 October UEFA's Organising Committee decided to assign the hosting to England or Italy (expressing its favour to the latter, the former having already hosted the FIFA World Cup just 11 years earlier), and on 12 November the Organising Committee and the Executive Committee announced that Italy had been chosen unanimously. Seven countries had to qualify for the finals, and the draw for the qualifying round took place in Rome on 30 November 1977. Also for the first time, the hosts, in this case Italy, qualified automatically for the finals.

Overview

Because of the expanded format, the finals tournament went through some changes as well. Two groups of four teams each were created; each team would play all others within their group. The winners of the groups would go straight to the final (there were no semi-finals), while the runners-up disputed the third place play-off.

The tournament failed to draw much enthusiasm from spectators and TV viewers. Attendance was generally poor except for matches involving the Italian team. The defensive style of play of many teams led to a succession of dull matches. Hooliganism, already a rising problem in the 1970s, made headlines again at the first-round match between England and Belgium where riot police had to use tear gas, causing the match to be held up for five minutes in the first half. The only bright spots were the emergence of a new generation of talented German stars such as Bernd Schuster, Hans-Peter Briegel, Horst Hrubesch, Hansi Müller and Karl-Heinz Rummenigge, and the inspirational performance of Belgium (around rising stars such as Jan Ceulemans, Eric Gerets, Jean-Marie Pfaff, and Erwin Vandenbergh) who reached the final, only losing to West Germany (2–1) by a Hrubesch goal two minutes before time.

Qualification

Greece made their major tournament debut. Spain and Italy made their first appearances since their wins in 1964 and 1968, respectively. England also qualified for the first time since 1968. Belgium qualified after missing the 1976 tournament. Yugoslavia didn't qualify after hosting the previous tournament. Other notable absentees were USSR, France and Hungary. This was the last time until 2008 Denmark failed to qualify.

Qualified teams

Venues

Squads

Each national team had to submit a squad of 22 players.

Match officials

Group stage

The teams finishing in the top position in each of the two groups progress to the finals, while the second placed teams advanced to the third place play-off, and bottom two teams were eliminated from the tournament.

All times are local, CEST (UTC+2).

Tiebreakers
If two or more teams finished level on points after completion of the group matches, the following tie-breakers were used to determine the final ranking:
 Greater number of points in all group matches
 Goal difference in all group matches
 Greater number of goals scored in all group matches
 Drawing of lots

Group 1

Group 2

Knockout stage

In the final, extra time and a penalty shoot-out were used to decide the winner if necessary. However, the third place play-off would go straight to a penalty shoot-out if the scores were level after 90 minutes.

All times are local, CEST (UTC+2).

Bracket

Third place play-off

Final

Statistics

Goalscorers

Awards

References

External links

 UEFA Euro 1980 at UEFA.com

 
1980
1979–80 in European football
1979–80 in Italian football
1980
June 1980 sports events in Europe